Canquelifá is a village in the Gabú Region of north-eastern Guinea-Bissau. It lies to the northwest of Buruntuma.

References

External links
Maplandia World Gazetteer

Populated places in Guinea-Bissau
Gabu Region